Aton Ben-Horin (born October 11, 1979) is an American music executive and record producer. As of June 10, 2016, Aton serves as Global Vice President of A&R for all of Warner Music Group's labels, including Atlantic Records and Warner Bros. Records. Ben-Horin is also the Owner of Plush Recording Studios, the CEO of Plush Management LLC, and a founding partner/producer for The Agency (production team).

Aton initially began his career as a musician and songwriter in a touring rock band, Atomic Tangerine, sharing the stage with acts such as Simple Plan and Jimmy Eat World Aton then ventured into the dance music scene and began DJing and producing dance music, under the name DJ 8on. He headlined the BreakBeat stage at Ultra Music Festival, radio mix shows, and local music venues. In August 2007 Aton opened Plush Recording Studios, which has developed into one of the premier Florida recording studios, with clients such as Nicki Minaj, Flo Rida, Justin Bieber, and Chris Brown, to name a few. Through his production and songwriting team, The Agency, Aton has produced and licensed a catalog of songs with the likes of John Legend, Rick Ross, Ciara, and many more. Through Plush Management LLC, he signed YouTube sensation Avery in 2010 and secured her a major record deal with Universal Motown. His multi-faceted path soon led him to A&R. In 2012, Aton began doing A&R at Warner Music Group, under Mike Caren (worldwide president of A&R, Warner Music Group).

Since joining Warner Music Group, Aton has delivered hit singles for Cardi B, David Guetta, Jason Derulo, Flo Rida, and more. Some of his most recent successes include Cardi B's "Ring" (feat. Kehlani), Flo Rida's "My House" and "G.D.F.R." Jason Derulo's "Talk Dirty" and "Wiggle," David Guetta's "Hey Mama" (featuring Nicki Minaj and Bebe Rexha) and "Bad" (featuring Showtek and Vassy). Aton is also responsible for signing various acts at Warner, including Alec Benjamin, Bhad Bhabie, Goody Grace, Justin Quiles, and others. His current management roster includes The Monarch, Johnny Goldstein, and The Aristocrats (production team).

Discography

Selected discography

References

1979 births
Living people
A&R people
American DJs
Record producers from Florida
American music industry executives
Songwriters from Florida